The list is not comprehensive, but is continuously being expanded and includes Persian poets as well as poets who write in Persian from Iran, Azerbaijan, Iraq, Georgia, Dagestan, Turkey, Syria, Afghanistan, Turkmenistan, Tajikistan, Uzbekistan, Lebanon, China, Pakistan, India and elsewhere.

From the 7th to the 8th centuries
Abu'l-Abbas Marwazi

9th century

10th century

 Ferdowsi فردوسی
 Abusaeid Abolkheir ابوسعید ابوالخیر
 Rudaki رودکی
 Abu Mansur Daqiqi ابومنصور دقیقی
 Mansur Al-Hallaj منصور حلاج
 Unsuri عنصری
 Rabi'a Balkhi رابعه بلخی
 Asjadi عسجدی
 Farrukhi Sistani فرخی سیستانی
Isma'il Muntasir اسماعیل منتصیر
 Kisai Marvazi کسائی مروزی
 Abu Shakur Balkhi ابوشکور بلخی
Abu Tahir Khosrovani(ابو طاهر خسروانی)
 Qabus, Qabus ibn Wushmagir, poet (died 1012) ابوالحسن قابوس بن وشمگیر بن زیار, شمس المعالی
 Ayyuqi عیوقی
 Khwaja Abdullah Ansari خواجه عبدالله انصاری
Shahid Balkhi شهید بلخی
Daqiqi دقیقی
Ma'ruf Balkhi معروف بلخی
Munjik Tirmidhi
 Li Shunxian (李舜弦) a concubine of the Chinese Emperor Wang Yan (Wang Zongyan)
Abu Taieb Mosabi
Aghaji Bukhari
Abbas Rabenjani
Abul'Ala Shushtari
Abul'Muid Balkhi
Abdullah Junaidi
Istighnayi Nishaburi
Badi' Balkhi
Bashar Marghazi
Bondar Razi
Bolmasal Bukhari
Hakak Marghazi
Khabazi Nishaburi
Khusravi Sarkhasi
Runaqi Bukhari
Sepehri Bukhari
Shakir Jalab
Tahir Chagani
Tayan Zhazkhay
Amareh Marvazi
Qamari Jurjani
Lokeri
Abu Ahmad Kateb
Masoudi Marvazi
Manteqi Razi

11th century

 al-Biruni (973–c. 1050)
 Fakhruddin As'ad Gurgani
 Abu'l Hasan Mihyar al-Daylami (d. 1037)
 Asad Gorgani
 Omar Khayyám, poet (1048–1131)
 Sanai, poet (1080–1131/1141)حکیم ابوالمجد مجدود ‌بن آدم سنایی غزنوی
 Hujviri d1073
 Abdul Qadir Gilani
 Manuchihri
 Abolfazl Beyhaghi, historian
 Abu'l-Hasan Bayhaqi
 Nasir Khusraw, traveler, writer and poet
 Baba Tahir Oryan
 Rabi'ah Quzdari
 Abu-al-faraj Runi
 Keykavus Eskandar
 Nizam al-Mulk, author of Siyasatnama
 Azraqi
 Masud Sa'd Salman
 Uthman Mukhtari
 Qatran Tabrizi
 Mughatil ibn Bakri
 Asadi Tusi اسدی طوسی
 Nizami نظامی گنجوی، نظامی
 Imam Muhammad Ghazali
 Abhari
Athir al-Din Akhsikati
Kafarak Ghaznavi
Labibi

12th century

 Suzani Samarqandi, شمس الدین محمد بن علی poet (d.1166)
 Adib Sabir ادیب صابر
 Am'aq عمعق بخارائی
 Anvari انوری ابیوردی
 Farid al-Din Attar, poet (about 1130-about 1220) فریدالدین عطار نیشاپوری
 Nizami, poet (about 1140-about 1203) نظامی
 Sheikh Ruzbehan شیخ روزبهان
 Abdul Qadir Gilani عبدالقادر گیلانی
 Khaqani Shirvani خاقانی شروانی
 Sanaayi سنایی
 Sheikh Ahmad Jami
 Muhammad Aufi
 Falaki Shirvani
 Hassan Ghaznavi, poet
 Sanai Ghaznavi, poet
 Mu'izzi
 Ibn Balkhi
 Uthman Mukhtari
 Mahsati, poet مهستی گنجوی
 Rashid al-Din Muhammad al-Umari Vatvat خولجه رشید الدین وطواط
 Nizami Arudhi Samarqandi نظامی عروضی سمرقندی

13th century

 Jalal al-Din Muhammad Rumi, poet (1207–1273)
 Sultan Walad
 Saadi, poet (1184–1283/1291?)
 Rashid-al-Din Hamadani, (1247–1318)
 Shams Tabrizi
 Sheikh Ruzbehan
 Zahed Gilani
 Khwaju Kermani
 Mahmoud Shabestari
 Najmeddin Razi
Zartosht Bahram-e Pazhdo
 Muhammad Aufi
 Qazi Beiza'i
Nizari Quhistani
 Awhadi Maraghai
Humam-i Tabrizi
 Auhaduddin Kermani
 Ghiyas al-Din ibn Rashid al-Din
 Ata-Malik Juvayni
 Nasreddin
 Abu Tawwama (died 1300)
Kamal al-Din Isfahani
Afdal al-Din Kashani
Badr Jajarmi
Basati Samarqandi
Keykavus Razi

14th century

 Hafez, poet (born about 1310–1325) حافظ
 Amir Khusrow, امیر خسرو دهلوی
Shah Shoja Mozaffari شاه شجاع مظفری
 Ubayd Zakani عبید زاکانی
Jahan Malek Khatun جهان ملک خاتون
Pur-Baha Jami پور بهار جامی
Assar Tabrizi عصار تبریزی
 Mir Sayyid Ali Hamadani, میر سید علی ابن شہاب الدین ہمدانی - Islamic preacher traveller and poet (1314–1384)
Padishah Khatun پادشاه خاتون
 Kamal Khujandi, poet, Sufism (1321–1401)
 Shahin Shirazi
 Junayd Shirazi
 Qasem-e Anvar
 Ghiyasuddin Azam Shah, Sultan of Bengal who jointly penned a Persian poem with Hafez
 Ghiyas al-Din ibn Rashid al-Din
 Shah Nimatullah Wali
Maghrebi Tabrizi
 Nur Qutb Alam, Bengali religious scholar
Salman Savaji
Sharaf al-Din Ram
Heydar Shirazi
Muin al-Din Jovaini
Junayd Shirazi
Shahab al-Din Bidavoni
Naser Bejehie
Imad al-Din Fazlavi
Shams al-Din Kashani
Imad Kermani
Nizam al-Din Qari
Jalal al-Din Atighi Tabrizi
Jalal Tabib Shirazi
Jalal Azod
Hassan Mutekalim
Rukn Davi-Dar
Jalal Ukkashe

15th century

 Jami, poet (1414–1492)
Ahli Shirazi
 Mir Ali Shir Nava'i, poet (1441–1501)
 Azari Tusi(1380-1462)
 Badriddin Hilali, poet (1470–1529)
 Imrani, poet (1454–1536)
 Fuzûlî, poet (1494–1556) فضولی
 Amir Shahi Sabzevari
 Esmat Bukhari
 Sharaf al-Din Sabzevari
 Hamedi Isfahani
 Qbuli Heravi
 Katebi Tarshizi
Asefi Heravi
Vahid Tabrizi
Fahmi Astarabadi

16th century

 Sheikh Bahaii, Scientist, architect, philosopher, and poet (1546–1620)
 Vahshi Bafghi 
 Hatefi, nephew of the poet Jami
Taleb Amoli (1586-1627)
 Baba Fighani Shirazi 
 Naw'i Khabushani
 'Orfi Shirazi 
 Faizi 
 Mohtasham Kashani
 Muhammad Arshad, Bengali author
 Syed Pir Badshah, Bengali author
 Ali Sher Bengali, religious author
 Syed Shah Israil, Bengali poet
 Nahapet Kuchak
 Teimuraz I of Kakheti (Tahmuras Khan)
 Syed Rayhan ad-Din, Bengali poet
Qazi Nurullah Shustari
 Sanai Mashhadi
 Hazegh Gilani
 Sahabi Astarabadi
 Sharaf Jahan Qazvini
 Shahidi Qumi
 Ghazali Mashhadi
 Fekri Jameh-Baf
 Ghasemi Gonabadi
 Lesani Shirazi
 Meili Mashhadi
 Naziri Nishaburi
 Vali Dashtbayazi
 Darvishi Dahaki
 Nizam Astarabadi
 Heyrati Tuni
 Khari Tabrizi
 Khajeghi Enayat
 Sabri Isfahani
 Tarhi Shirazi
 Shuja Kor
 Kami Qazvini
 Hejri Qumi
 Heydar Kuliche-Paz
 Abdi Shirazi
 Kahi Kabuli
 Malek Qomi
 Qeidi Shirazi
 Makhdom Sharifi
 Nizam al-Din Hashimi
 Gharari Gilani
 Hisabi Natanzi
 Mirak Salehi
 Serfi Savaji
 Hozuri Qumi
 Gheirati Shirazi
 Voghui Nishaburi
 Vahshi Jushghani
 Voghui Tabrizi
 Shuaib Jushghani
 Heydar Muamayi
 Fosuni Yazdi
 Ali Komrehyi

17th century

 Saib Tabrizi, poet (1601/02-1677)
 Mohammad Taher Vahid Qazvini(1621-1700)
 Kalim Kashani(1581/1585-1651)
 Mohammad Qoli Salim Tehrani (died 1647)
 Shah Abdur Rahim, Indian religious scholar
Jamila Isfahani, a poetess 
 Shah Waliullah Dehlawi, Indian religious leader
 Teimuraz I of Kakheti (Tahmuras Khan)
 Abul Ma'āni Abdul Qader Bedil (1642–1720)
 Guru Gobind Singh (1666–1708) - Composed the famous Zafarnamah
 Zeb-un-Nissa Makhfi (1637–1702)
 Razi Danesh Mashadi(died 1665)
 Bhai Nand Lal (1633–1713)
Gani Kashmiri (c. 1630 – c. 1669)
Mir Razi Artimani
Kamali
Munir Lahori
Zolali Khansari
Najib Kashani
Naziri Nishaburi
Saber Kermani
Tasir Tabrizi
Qasem Mashhadi
Masih Kashani
Vaez Qazvini
Rafi Mashhadi
Qudsi Mashhadi
Zafarkhan Hasan
Mir Nejat Isfhani

18th century

 Shah Abdul Aziz Dehlavi, Indian religious scholar (شاه عبد العزیز دهلوی)
 Azar Bigdeli(آذر بیگدلی)
 Ram Mohan Roy, Bengali Hindu reformer (رام موهن رای)
 Hazin Lahiji (حزین لاهیجی)
 Izzatullah Bengali (عزّت‌الله بنگالی), author
 Hatef Esfehani, poet (هاتف اصفهانی)
Effat Nasabeh, poetess ( عفت نصابه) 
 Lutfullah Tabrizi (لطف‌الله تبریزی)
 Mirza Asadullah Khan Ghalib, (مرزا اسد اللہ خان غالب)
Zayn al-Abidin Shirvani, (زین‌العابدین شیروانی)
 I'tisam-ud-Din, Bengali diplomat (اعتصام الدین)
 Ghulam Mustafa Burdwani, Bengali religious scholar and poet (غلام مصطفی بردوانی)
 Vahdat Kermanshahi
 Vesal Shirazi
 Forughi Bastami
 Yaghma Jandaghi
 Neshat Esfahani
 Sadat Kazeruni
 Kosar Hamedani
 Sabahi Bigdeli
 Nategh Makrani

19th century

 Agha Ahmad Ali, Bengali poet (آغا احمد علي)
 Mohammad-Taghi Bahar, Malek o-Sho'arā Bahār محمد تقی بهار(ملک الشعرا)
 Ali Akbar Dehkhoda, linguist and journalist علی اکبر دهخدا
 Mirza Asadullah Khan Ghalib مرزا اسد اللہ خان غالب
 Hamza Hakimzade Niyazi, poet, author, scholar (1889–1929) 
 Mirzadeh Eshghi میرزاده عشقی
 Reza-Qoli Khan Hedayat, poet and historian رضا قلی خان هدایت
 Iraj Mirza ایرج میرزا
 Nassakh, Bengali poet (نساخ)
Mohammad Taqi Sepehr (محمدتقی سپهر)
 Ebrahim Poordavood, ancient languages, Avesta ابراهیم پور داوود
 Aref Qazvini عارف قزوینی
 Hassan Roshdieh حسن رشدیه
 Siyyid ‘Ali Muhammad Shirazi, founder of Babism, سيد علی ‌محمد شیرازی
 Táhirih Qorrat al-'Ayn, Babi poet and theologian
 Mirza Husayn 'Ali Nuri, founder of the Baha’i Faith, میرزا حسین‌علی نوری
 Farrokhi Yazdi فرخی یزدی
 Khwaja Ahsanullah, Kashmiri-Dhakaiya poet (خواجه احسن‌الله)
 Khwaja Muhammad Afzal, Kashmiri-Dhakaiya poet (خواجه محمد افضل)
 Sheyda Gerashi, poet and Panegyrist شیدای گراشی
 Qaani قاآنی
 Abd al-Hosayn Ayati, poet, orator, author and historian عبدالحسین آیتی
 Ubaidullah Al Ubaidi Suhrawardy, Bengali poet (عبید الله العبیدی سهروردی)

20th century

 Ali Abdolrezaei (علی عبدالرضایی)
 Abdolali Dastgheib, Author (عبدالعلی دست غیب)
 Abdumalik Bahori, Tajik-Persian poet
 Abdolkarim Soroush, philosopher
 Abolghasem Lahouti, communist poet (ابوالقاسم لاهوتی)
 Adib Boroumand, poet, politician, and lawyer (ادیب برومند)
 Ahmad Kamyabi Mask, writer and translator (احمد کامیابی مسک)
 Ahmad Kasravi (احمد کسروی)
 Ahmad NikTalab (احمد نیک طلب), poet and linguistic
 Ahmad Raza Khan (احمد رضا خان)
 Ahmad Shamlou (احمد شاملو), poet 
 Ali Akbar Dehkhoda, linguist (علی اکبر دهخدا)
 Ali Mohammad Afghani, writer (علی محمد افغانی)
 Ali Shariati, sociologist and theologian (علی شریعتی)
 Aref Qazvini, (عارف قزوینی)
 Asad Gulzoda, poet 
 Aziz Motazedi, novelist (عزیز معتضدی)
 Bahman Sholevar, writer and poet (بهمن شعله ور)
 Bahram Bayzai, playwright (بهرام بیضایی) 
 Bijan Elahi, poet and translator
 Bilal Yousaf, writer, critic
 Bozor Sobir, poet (بازارصابر)
 Bozorg Alavi, (بزرگ علوی) writer
 Dariush Shayegan (داریوش شایگان)
 Ebrahim Nabavi, satirist (ابراهیم نبوی)
 Ehsan Naraghi, Scholar, sociologist and writer
 Esmail Khoi, Poet
 Ezzat Goushegir
 Farzona, poet (Фарзона/فرزانه)
 Farzaneh Aghaeipour (فرزانه آقایی‌پور)
 Fereidoon Tavallali, poet (فریدون توللی)
 Fereshteh Ahmadi, writer (فرشته احمدی)
 Fereydoun Moshiri, poet (فريدون مشيری)
 Forough Farrokhzad, poet (فروغ فرخزاد)
 Ghazaleh Alizadeh, novelist (غزاله علیزاده)
 Gholam Hossein Saedi, writer
 Gholamhossein Mosahab, encyclopedist (غلامحسین مصاحب)
 Gholamreza Rouhani, Poet (غلامرضا روحاني)
 Gulnazar Keldi, Tajik poet
 Hamid Mosadegh(حمید مصدق)
 Hassan Roshdieh (حسن رشدیه)
 Heydar Yaghma (حیدر یغما)
 Homaira Nakhat Dastgirzada (حمیرا نکهت دستگیرزاده)
 Houshang Golshiri (هوشنگ گلشیری)
 Houshang Moradi Kermani (هوشنگ مرادی کرمانی)
 Hushang Ebtehaj (H. A. Sayeh) (هوشنگ ابتهاج)
 Ibrahim Ali Tashna, Bengali poet (تشنه)
 Ismail Alam, Bengali poet (اسماعیل عالم)
 Iraj Mirza, poet (ایرج میرزا) 
 Iraj Pezeshkzad, novelist (ایرج پزشکزاد)
 Jalal Al-e-Ahmad (جلال آل احمد)
 Zhaleh Amouzegar (ژاله آموزگار)
 Khalilullah Khalili (خلیل الله خلیلی) Poet and writer
 Kioumars Saberi Foumani (کیومرث صابری فومنی)
 Loiq Sher-Ali (لائق شیرعلی), poet from Tajikistan
 Leila Kasra, poet and lyricist
 Mahbod Seraji, Writer (مهبد سراجی)
 Mahmoud Dowlatabadi (محمود دولت آبادی)
 Mahmoud Melmasi - Azarm, poet (محمود ملماسي، آزرم)
 Majid Adibzadeh, writer and scholar (مجید ادیب‌زاده)
 Majid M. Naini writer, poet, translator, speaker (مجید نایینی)
 Mana Aghaee, poet, author and translator (مانا آقایی) 
 Manouchehr Atashi (منوچهر آتشی)
 Marjane Satrapi, graphic novelist
 Maryam Jafari Azarmani (مریم جعفری آذرمانی), poet, critic
 Massoud Behnoud (مسعود بهنود), journalist
 Mehdi Akhavan-Sales, poet (مهدی اخوان ثالث)
 Mina Assadi, poet, author, journalist and songwriter (مینا اسدی)
 Mina Dastgheib, poet (مینا دست غیب)
 Mirzadeh Eshghi (میرزاده عشقی)
 Mirzo Tursunzoda, Tajik poet
 Mohammad Ali Jamalzadeh, writer (محمد علی جمالزاده)
 Mohammad Hejazi, novelist and playwright
 Mohammad Hossein Shahriar, poet (محمد حسين شهريار)
 Mohammad Jafar Pouyandeh (محمد جعفر پوینده)
 Mohammad Mokhtari(محمد مختاری)
 Mohammad Reza Ali Payam (Haloo), poet (محمدرضا عالی‌پیام)
 Mohammad Reza Shafiei-Kadkani, poet (محمدرضا شفیعی کدکنی)
 Mohammad-Amin Riahi, scholar and writer (محمدامین ریاحی)
 Mohammad-Reza Shafiei-Kadkani, poet
 Mohammad-Taghi Bahar, poet(محمد تقی بهار)
 Monica Malek-Yonan, playwright
 Morteza Motahhari, theologian (مرتضی مطهری)
 Muhammad Faizullah, Bengali poet (محمد فيض الله)
 Muhammad Iqbal, Pakistani poet (محمد اقبال)
 Nader Naderpour, poet (نادر نادرپور)
 Nima Yushij, poet (نیما یوشیج)
 Nosrat Rahmani, poet (نصرت رحمانی)
 Parvin E'tesami, poet (پروین اعتصامی)
 Rahi Mo'ayeri, poet (رهی معیری)
 Reza Baraheni, poet and critic (رضا براهنی)
 Reza Khoshnazar, novelist(رضا خوش‌بين خوش‌نظر)
 Reza Gholi Khan Hedayat, poet and historian (رضا قلی‌خان هدایت)
 Reza Shirmarz, playwright, author, translator, poet and essayist (رضا شیرمرز) 
 Roya Hakakian, poet, writer, journalist (رویا حکاکیان)
 Saboktakin Saloor, novelist
 Sadegh Choubak, writer (صادق چوبک)
 Sadegh Hedayat (صادق هدایت)
 Sadriddin Ayni (صدرالدين عيني), Tajikistan's national poet and one of the most important writers of the country's history.
 Saeed Nafisi, scholar, poet and writer
 Sahar Delijani, novelist (سحر دلیجانی)
 Samad Behrangi, writer (صمد بهرنگی)
 Seyed Ali Salehi, poet
 Sems Kesmai, poet (شمس کسمایی)
 Shahrnush Parsipur, novelist (شهرنوش پارسی‌پور)
 Shams Langeroodi, poet (شمس لنگرودی)
 Shamim Hashimi, poet and writer (شمیم ہاشمی)
 Shapour Bonyad, poet (شاپور بنیاد)
 Sheema Kalbasi, poet and translator (شیما کلباسی)
 Siavash Kasraie poet (سیاوش کسرایی)
 Simin Behbahani, poet (سیمین بهبهانی)
 Simin Daneshvar, writer (سیمین دانشور)
 Sipandi Samarkandi, Tajik bilingual poet
 Sohrab Sepehri, poet and painter (سهراب سپهری) 
 Syed Waheed Ashraf, Poet, Sufi, Scholar, Critic
 Syed Abid Ali Abid Poet and Author
 Temur Zulfiqorov, Tajik poet (Темур Зулфиқоров)
 Varand, poet (واراند) 
 Yadollah Royaee, poet (یدالله رویایی)
 Hossein Rajabian, Playwright (حسین رجبیان)
 Yasmina Reza, poet (یاسمینا رضا)
 Zana Pirzad novelist (زانا پیرزاد)
 Niloufar Talebi (نیلوفر طالبی)
 Sholeh Wolpé poet, playwright (شعله ولپی)
 Iraj Zebardast, poet (ايرج زبردست)

See also 

 List of Iranian writers

References

 Morteza Motahhari, Khadamāt-i mutaqābil-i Islām va Īrān, c 1350s Vol 14, p583-590  
 E.G. Browne. Literary History of Persia. (Four volumes, 2,256 pages, and twenty-five years in the writing). 1998. 
 Mohammad Mokhtary Mashhad 1944 – Tehran 2002. Writer of Siavash nameh published by Bonyad-e-Shahnameh. writer of Tarikhe ostorehhay-e-Iran. one of the Persian researchers. Murdered by Islamic regime. He was one of the 72 Persians murdered by Emami terror team (Ghatlhaye zangirehi). kidnapped on his way home and choked to dead.
 Jan Rypka, History of Iranian Literature. Reidel Publishing Company.    
 

Poets
Lists of poets by language